Marcus Reese (born June 15, 1981 in San Jose, California) is an American football linebacker. He last played with the Chicago Bears of the National Football League in 2004.

Reese played high school football at Oak Grove High School in San Jose and college football at UCLA.

External links
NFL.com player page

1981 births
Living people
Players of American football from San Jose, California
American football linebackers
University of California, Los Angeles alumni
UCLA Bruins football players
Chicago Bears players
Cologne Centurions (NFL Europe) players